Yayamari (other names: Ambrocca or Ambroja in Hispanicized spellings or Montura) is a mountain in the Vilcanota mountain range in the Andes of Peru, about  high. It is situated in the Cusco Region, Canchis Province, Pitumarca District, and in the Quispicanchi Province, Marcapata District. Yayamari lies northeast of Sibinacocha, north of the lake named Amayuni and northwest of Huila Aje and Condoriquiña.

Elevation 
Other data from available digital elevation models: SRTM yields 6016 metres, ASTER 5984 metres, ALOS 6023 metres and TanDEM-X 6071 metres. The height of the nearest key col is 5327 meters, leading to a topographic prominence of 722 meters. Yayamari is considered a Mountain Subgroup according to the Dominance System  and its dominance is 11.94%. Its parent peak is Alcamarinayoc and the Topographic isolation is 14.4 kilometers.

First Ascent 
Yayamari was first climbed by Günther Hauser, Theodore Achilles, Bernhard Kuhn (Germany) on August 15, 1957.

See also 
 Aquichua

References

Mountains of Peru
Mountains of Cusco Region
Glaciers of Peru
Six-thousanders of the Andes